These are the results of the women's foil competition in fencing at the 2004 Summer Olympics in Athens.  A total of 25 women competed in this event.  Competition took place in the Fencing Hall at the Helliniko Olympic Complex on August 18.

Tournament results
The field of 25 fencers competed in a single-elimination tournament to determine the medal winners.  Semifinal losers proceeded to a bronze medal match.
As there were less than 32 entrants in this event, seven fencers had byes in the first round.

Results

References

Yahoo! Sports Athens 2004 Summer Olympics Fencing Results

Women's foil
2004 in women's fencing
Women's events at the 2004 Summer Olympics